A constitutional referendum was held in Syria on 1 December 1961. Voters had the choice of submitting a green ballot marked "I am in favour of the temporary constitution" or a red one marked "I am against the temporary constitution". However, the ballot was not secret, and votes were made in the presence of an official. The temporary constitution was approved by 97.1% of voters.

Results

References

1961 referendums
1961 in Syria
Referendums in Syria
Constitutional referendums in Syria